Olívio Aurélio Fazza (June 25, 1925 – December 25, 2008) was a Brazilian Bishop of the Roman Catholic Church.

He was born in Juiz de Fora.

At the age of 29, Fazza was ordained as a priest. On May 5, 1978 he was appointed as Bishop of Foz do Iguaçu, he was ordained on August 12. He retired on November 28, 2001 and was succeeded by Laurindo Guizzardi.

He died in Foz do Iguacu, aged 83.

References

External links
Catholic-Hierarchy - Olívio Aurélio Fazza

1925 births
2008 deaths
20th-century Roman Catholic bishops in Brazil
Roman Catholic bishops of Foz do Iguaçu
People from Juiz de Fora